The 2021 Gibtelecom Rock Cup was a single-leg knockout tournament contested by clubs from Gibraltar, with twelve clubs participating. The winner of the competition qualified to compete in the 2021–22 UEFA Europa Conference League.

Europa were the defending champions after defeating Gibraltar United by a score of 3–0 in the 2019 final. There was no 2020 winner, as the tournament was abandoned after 2 rounds due to the COVID-19 pandemic.

First round
The draw for the all rounds of this season's tournament was held on 12 March 2021. Seven Gibraltar National League sides entered at this stage along with Hound Dogs, who were competing in the abandoned 2020–21 Gibraltar Intermediate League. Games were played on 6–7 April.

Quarter–finals
The 4 teams that received a bye from the first round entered the competition at the quarter final stage. These 4 teams were: Mons Calpe, Lynx, Manchester 62 and College 1975.

Semi-finals
The semi-finals were played on 20–21 April. After winning their match on penalties, Europa were found to be in breach of competition rules and Lincoln were awarded a 3–0 victory.

Final
The final was played on 19 May.

Scorers
4 goals

  Dylan Borge (Europa)
  Adrián Gallardo (Europa)

3 goals

  Lee Casciaro (Lincoln Red Imps)

2 goals

  Liam Walker (Europa)
  Mikey Yome (Europa)
  Salvatore Gallo (Glacis United)
  Miguel Londero (Glacis United)
  Kike Gómez (Lincoln Red Imps)

1 goal

  Javi Casares (Bruno's Magpies)
  Kaylan Franco (College 1975)
  Olmo González (Europa)
  Alessandro Borghi (Glacis United)
  Craig Galliano (Glacis United)
  Quentin Kaleba (Glacis United)
  Lython Marquez (Glacis United)
  Joseph Waine (Hound Dogs)
  Fernando Carralero (Lincoln Red Imps)
  Jamie Coombes (Lincoln Red Imps)
  Kian Ronan (Lincoln Red Imps)
  Graeme Torrilla (Lincoln Red Imps)
  Luke Wall (Lincoln Red Imps)
  Alberto Valdivia (Lynx)
  Robert Montovio (Manchester 62)
  Diego Díaz (Mons Calpe)
  Juanfri (St Joseph's)
  Andrew Hernandez (St Joseph's)

See also
2020–21 Gibraltar National League
2020–21 Gibraltar Intermediate League

References

External links
Gibraltar Football Association

Rock Cup
Rock Cup
Rock Cup